Fujiwara no Fusasaki (藤原 房前, 681 – May 25, 737) was a member of the Fujiwara clan and the founder of the Hokke branch of the Fujiwara.

Career
Fusasaki was a Sangi (associate counselor) in the Daijō-kan.

He founded the temple of Sugimoto-dera in Kamakura in 734 with the priest Gyōki (668–749). The temple's legend holds that Empress Komyo (701–760) in the Nara Period (710–794) instructed Fusasaki, the then high-ranking minister, and a famous priest named Gyoki (668–749) to build the temple enshrining a statue of Eleven-Headed Kan'non, or Ekadasamukha in Sanskrit, as the main object of worship. Priest Gyoki fashioned the statue himself because he was also a great sculptor.

Fusasaki died during a major smallpox epidemic in 737.

Family
Father: Fujiwara no Fuhito (藤原不比等, 659–720)
Mother: Soga no Shōshi (蘇我娼子, ?–?), daughter of Soga no Murajiko (蘇我連子)
Main-wife (seishitsu): Muro no O-Okimi (牟漏女王, ?–746), daughter of Minu-Ō (美努王)

Wife: Daughter of Kusagunokura no Oyu (春日倉老)

Wife: Daughter of (片野朝臣)

Wife: Daughter of (阿波采)

Children with unknown mother:

Notes

References
 Brinkley, Frank and Dairoku Kikuchi. (1915). A History of the Japanese People from the Earliest Times to the End of the Meiji Era. New York: Encyclopædia Britannica. OCLC 413099
 Nussbaum, Louis-Frédéric and Käthe Roth. (2005).  Japan encyclopedia. Cambridge: Harvard University Press. ;  OCLC 58053128
 Titsingh, Isaac. (1834).  Annales des empereurs du Japon (Nihon Odai Ichiran).  Paris: Royal Asiatic Society, Oriental Translation Fund of Great Britain and Ireland. OCLC 5850691 

Fujiwara clan
681 births
737 deaths
People of Asuka-period Japan
People of Nara-period Japan
Buddhism in the Asuka period
Buddhism in the Nara period
Deaths from smallpox
Infectious disease deaths in Japan